Tillandsia nuptialis is a species in the genus Tillandsia. This species is endemic to Brazil.

References

nuptialis
Flora of Brazil